Orihara (written: 折原 lit. "opportunity field") is a Japanese surname. Notable people with the surname include:

, Japanese photographer
, Japanese professional wrestler
Yuka Orihara (born 2000), Finnish ice dancer

Fictional characters
, a character in the light novel series Durarara!!

See also
Orihara Station, a railway station in Yorii, Saitama Prefecture, Japan

Japanese-language surnames